If You Wish Upon Me is a South Korean television series starring Ji Chang-wook, Sung Dong-il, and Choi Soo-young. It aired on KBS2 from August 10 to September 29, 2022, airing every Wednesday and Thursday at 21:50 (KST) for 16 episodes. It is also available for streaming on Viu in the Middle East, South Africa, and selected regions in Asia, and on Viki in the Americas, Europe, and Oceania.

Overview
The storyline of If You Wish Upon Me has been inspired by a true account of the Make-a-Wish Foundation in the Netherlands. The story revolves around a young man (Ji Chang-wook) with a troubled past who struggled throughout his life, enters a hospice hospital on the order of community service. He joins Team Genie, a group which fulfills the last wishes of hospice patients, and learns to care for others for the first time. He, with Team Genie, listens to and carries out the last wishes of people at the end of their lives through various episodes.

Cast

Main
 Ji Chang-wook as Yoon Gyeo-ree
 A young ex-convict who volunteers at a hospice hospital after going through an orphanage, a juvenile detention center, and a prison.
 Sung Dong-il as Kang Tae-shik
 The leader of volunteer group, Team Genie, who grants the last wishes of hospice hospital patients.
 Choi Soo-young as Seo Yeon-joo
 A nurse at hospice hospital with bright cheerful personality.

Supporting

People related to Team Genie
 Yang Hee-kyung as Yeom Soon-ja
 A cook and member of the volunteer group, Team Genie.
 Gil Hae-yeon as Choi Deok-ja
 A cleaner at hospice and a member of Team Genie.
 Yoo Soon-woong as Hwang Cha-young
 A silent and sincere man who works with Choi Deok-ja.
 Jeon Chae-eun as Yoo Seo-jin
 A high school student and the only teen member of Team Genie.
 Park Jung-pyo as Mr.Koo 
 A social worker and a trusted sponsor of Team Genie.
 Shin Joo-hwan as Yang Chi-hoon
 A doctor at hospice.

People related to Yoon Gyeo-ree
 Won Ji-an as Ha Joon-kyung
 A woman whose everything is Yoon Gyeo-ree.
 Nam Tae-hoon as Jang Seok-jun 
 A person from the same orphanage as Yoon Gyeo-ree.
 Park Se-jun as Wang Jin-goo
 A friend of Yoon Gyeo-ree, a veterinarian.

Others
 Park Jin-joo as Im Se-hee
 Youngest patient in hospice, a musical actress.
 Nam Kyung-joo as Yoon Ki-chun 
Patient in room 403 and Yoon Gyeo-ree's father.
 Jung Dong-hwan as Mr. Yoon
 A terminal ill patient at hospice.
 Jeon Moo-song as Mr. Byun
 A terminal ill patient at hospice.
 Yeo One as Kwak Hyeong-jun 
 Yoo Seo-jin's boyfriend who got into a car accident.
 Park Jung-yeon as Choi Min-kyung 
 Cousin of Jae-yeon and Ho-yeon, granddaughter of Grandma in Nursing Home Hospital No. 102.
 Jang Jae-hee as Jae-yeon
 Granddaughter of Grandma in Nursing Home Hospital No. 102.
 Lee Chul-mu as Ho-yeon
 Grandson of Grandma in Nursing Home Hospital No. 102.

Special appearances
 Kim Shin-rok as Hye-jin
 Min Woo-hyuk as Pyo Gyu-tae, Musical theater actor
 Lee Yoo-mi as young woman
 Lee Hyo-bin as Pyo Cheol-woo's Victim

Original soundtrack

Part 1

Part 2

Part 3

Part 4

Part 5

Part 6

Part 7

Part 8

Part 9

Production
On September 1, 2021, it was reported that main casting had been finalised. Filming began on September 27. On April 7, 2022, Choi Soo-young posted on Instagram that the filming of the series had ended.

Viewership

References

External links
  
 
 

Korean-language television shows
Korean Broadcasting System television dramas
2022 South Korean television series debuts

Television episodes set in hospitals
South Korean pre-produced television series
Korean-language Viu (streaming media) exclusive international distribution programming